White cake is a type of cake that is often vanilla flavored and made without egg yolks. White cakes can be butter cakes or sponge cakes. Angel food cake is a type of sponge cake that is considered a white cake because it is made using only egg whites. White cake is used as a component for desserts  like icebox cake, and some variations on charlotte russe and trifle. White cake can be made by the creaming or reverse creaming methods; the latter can be used to make tier cakes with a tighter crumb. It is a typical choice for tiered wedding cakes because of the appearance and texture of the cake.

See also
 List of cakes

References

Cakes
Wedding food